Directions is an album of American guitarist Norman Blake, released in 1978. It was reissued in 1987 on CD along with Live at McCabe's by Takoma.

Track listing
 "Blue Ridge Mountain Blues"
 "Thebes"
 "The L & N Don't Stop Here Anymore"
 "Medley: Loch Lavan Castle/Santa Ana's Retreat/Cattle in the Cane"
 "Poor Ellen Smith"
 "Uncle Sam"
 "Ice on the Road"
 "Rake and the Rambling Blade"
 "High Dad in the Morning"
 "Father's Hall"
 "White House Breakdown"
 "'76 Blues"

Personnel
Norman Blake – guitar, mandolin, mando-cello, vocals, fiddle
Nancy Blake - cello, guitar, mandolin, vocals
Miles Anderson - alto trombone, tenor trombone, bass trumpet, baritone horn, bass trombone
Joseph Byrd - arranging [Horns] (Uncle Sam)
George Belle - engineer

References

1978 albums
Norman Blake (American musician) albums